Bhagini Nivedita College (BNC) is one of the 85 constituent colleges of the University of Delhi. The college is located in Kair, near Najafgarh, New Delhi.

History
The college was established in August 1993 as a 'Women's College' in the South Western part of Delhi and was named after Bhagini Nivedita, a Scots-Irish social worker, author, teacher and a disciple of Swami Vivekananda, who dedicated her whole life for the education and welfare of women. The college was founded by the Govt. of Delhi.

Courses
Bhagini Nivedita College started with B.A. (Pass) and B.A. (Hons.) Hindi in 1993, and progressively added more courses later. After the implementation of FYUP in 2013, honours course were added in Discipline I in commerce, history, home science, physics and political science by the college.

Programmes
Under the aegis of its affiliate University of Delhi, the college offers undergraduate courses in:
 Bachelor of Arts (B.A) Hons. in Hindi
 Bachelor of Arts (B.A) Programme
 Bachelor of Commerce (B.Com)
 Bachelor of Science (BSc) in Physical Sciences with Chemistry
 Bachelor of Science (BSc) in Physical Sciences with Computer Science
 Bachelor of Science (BSc) Hons. in Physics
 Bachelor of Science (BSc) Hons. in Home Science
 Bachelor of Arts (B.A) Hons. in Political Science
 Bachelor of Arts (B.A) Hons. in History

References

External links
 Bhagini Nivedita College

Delhi University
1993 establishments in Delhi
Women's universities and colleges in Delhi